Antonio José Martínez Palacios (12 December 190211 October 1936), professionally known as Antonio José, was a Spanish composer.  Maurice Ravel apparently said of Antonio José: "He will become the Spanish composer of our century", however, his music lay forgotten until the 1980s.

Career
Born in Burgos, Antonio José became a music teacher at a Jesuit school and conducted the city choir in Burgos. The sheer volume of his work (he died at 33) was prodigious. He penned his first composition when he was 14. He was hired as a director of a musical review in Burgos at the age of 18. He wrote extensively for voice in his quest to present the melodies of his native Burgos to the world. His compositions, especially the Sinfonía castellana and Suite Ingenua, put his orchestration on a par with anything at the time in the twentieth century. His most famous work is a sonata for guitar.

His harmonic understanding put him in the forefront of post-impressionist composers, and though a disciple of Ravel, his particular voice and choice of medium set him distinctly apart. His chief biographer, Miguel Ángel Palacios Garoz, points out that Antonio José was not only a prolific composer but a writer with an intellectually facile mind that was open to influences from all fronts of contemporary music.

Death
In 1936 he was detained in Burgos.
He was executed by a Falangist firing at Estépar, province of Burgos. Like Federico García Lorca, who met a similar fate, his remains have yet to be identified.

Recordings
Sinfonía castellana, Evocaciones, El mozo de mulas, Spanish Classics, Orquesta Sinfónica de Castilla y León, Conductor: Alejandro Posada. Naxos 2003.

References

Sources
Gilardino, Angelo (1990). Introduction to Antonio José 'Sonata' . Ancona: Berbèn.
Palacios Garoz, Miguel Ángel (2002). En tinta roja: cartas y otros escritos de Antonio José. Burgos: Instituto Municipal de Cultura.

1902 births
1936 deaths
People from Burgos
Spanish classical composers
20th-century classical composers
People executed by Spain by firing squad
Victims of the White Terror (Spain)
Executed Spanish people
Spanish male classical composers
20th-century Spanish musicians
20th-century Spanish male musicians